The 38th TVyNovelas Awards is an academy of special awards to the best of telenovelas and TV series. The awards ceremony took place on October 31, 2020. The ceremony was televised in Mexico on Las Estrellas. Michelle Rodríguez and Jorge van Rankin hosted the ceremony. The finalists were announced on March 13, 2020. The first winners were also announced on March 13, 2020.

The ceremony was originally to take place on March 29, 2020. Omar Chaparro was originally set to host. However, on March 13, the ceremony was postponed to a future date due to public health concerns regarding the international coronavirus pandemic.

La usurpadora won 7 awards, the most for the evening including Best Telenovela of the Year. Among other winners are Vencer el miedo who won 4 awards, Ringo and Médicos won one award each.

Summary of awards and nominations

Awards and nominees 
Winners are listed first, highlighted in boldface.

Telenovelas

Others

Favoritos del público 
"Favoritos del publico" are categories that the public votes for through the official website of the awards. The awards were presented by Erika Buenfil and Alexis Ayala.

References 

TVyNovelas Awards
TVyNovelas Awards ceremonies
TVyNovelas Awards
Premios TVyNovelas
TVyNovelas Awards
TVyNovelas Awards